Viktor Romanovich Pryazhnikov (23 December 1933 in Elektrostal, Soviet Union – 17 April 2008 in Moscow, Russia), was a Russian ice hockey player.  During  his career he played  for Krylya Sovetov Moscow and the Soviet Hockey League where he scored 166 goals in  400 matches, and was called to  the Soviet national  team.  On  9 January 1955 he played against  Sweden, and in  1960 he won  a bronze medal  in  the Winter Olympics. He was inducted into the Russian and Soviet Hockey Hall of Fame in 1991.

References

External links
 Russian and Soviet Hockey Hall of Fame bio
 Statistics

1933 births
2008 deaths
Krylya Sovetov Moscow players
People from Elektrostal
Olympic ice hockey players of the Soviet Union
Olympic bronze medalists for the Soviet Union
Olympic medalists in ice hockey
Ice hockey players at the 1960 Winter Olympics
Sportspeople from Moscow Oblast